This is the list of List A cricket records of Nepal national cricket teams showing their team records and individual performance in list A format of the game.

Listing notation 

Team notation
 (300-3) indicates that a team scored 300 runs for three wickets and the innings was closed,
either due to a successful run chase or if no overs remained (or are able) to be bowled.
 (300) indicates that a team scored 300 runs and was all out,
either by losing all ten wickets or by having one or more batsmen unable to bat and losing the remaining wickets.

Batting notation
 (100) indicates that a batsman scored 100 runs and was out.
 (100*) indicates that a batsman scored 100 runs and was not out.

Bowling notation
 (5-25) indicates that a bowler has captured 5 wickets while giving away 25 runs.

Currently playing
 Record holders who are currently in the recent team squad of the series/tournament are shown in bold.
Comparison

Team records

Team wins, losses, and ties

Matches played (total)

Matches played (by country)

Team scoring records

Highest first innings totals

Individual records

Individual records (batting)

Most career runs

Highest career average

Highest career strike rate

Most centuries in a career

Most half-centuries in a career

Most sixes in a career

Most fours in a career

Highest individual scores

Individual records (bowling)

Most career wickets (minimum 5 wickets)

Best Bowling Figures 
(Minimum 3 Wickets in an inning)

Best career averages 
(Minimum 10 Wickets)

Best career economy rate

Best career strike rate

Most 5 wickets Haul

Most 4 wickets Haul

Individual records (wicket-keeping)

Most dismissals in career

Individual Records(Fielding)

Most Catches in a career

Individual records (other)

Most Matches played in career

Most Man of the Match Winner

References 

Nepalese cricket lists
Nepal